Samyang Optics is a South Korean manufacturer of camera lenses for several major brands of third-party mounts for still photography and video cameras. The company was founded in 1972 and has about 150 employees. Samyang exports to 58 countries through 39 overseas agents and distributors.  

Samyang products are also sold under a wide variety of different brand names.  Some examples are Rokinon, Bower, Opteka, Vivitar, Phoenix and Quantaray.

Products

Autofocus lenses 

Autofocus lenses:

For Canon EF Mount: 
 AF 14 mm 2.8 EF 
 AF 85 mm 1.4 EF 

For Canon RF Mount:
 AF 14 mm 2.8 RF
 AF 85 mm 1.4 RF

For Sony E-Mount:
 AF 14 mm 2.8 FE 
 AF 18 mm 2.8 FE 
 AF 24 mm 2.8 FE 
 AF 35 mm 1.4 FE 
 AF 35 mm 1.8 FE 
 AF 35 mm 2.8 FE
 AF 45 mm 1.8 FE 
 AF 50 mm 1.4 FE 
 AF 75 mm 1.8 FE 
 AF 85 mm 1.4 FE
AF 24-70mm 2.8 FE

For Nikon F Mount:
 AF 14 mm 2.8 F
 AF 85 mm 1.4 F

Manual focus lenses 

Interchangeable manual focus lenses for 9 different mounts.
MF 85 mm 1.4 RF
 MF 14 mm 2.8 RF
 85 mm 1.8 ED UMC CS
 12 mm 2.8 ED AS NCS Fish-Eye
 14 mm 2.8 ED AS IF UMC
 20 mm 1.8 ED AS UMC
 24 mm 1.4 ED AS IF UMC
 T/S 24 mm 3.5 ED AS UMC
 35 mm 1.4 AS UMC
 50 mm 1.4 AS UMC
 85 mm 1.4 AS IF UMC
 10 mm 2.8 ED AS NCS CS
 100 mm 2.8 ED UMC Macro
 135 mm 2.0 ED UMC
 8 mm 3.5 UMC Fish-Eye CS II
 16 mm 2.0 ED AS UMC CS
 7.5 mm 3.5 Fish-Eye
 8 mm 2.8 UMC Fish-Eye II
 12 mm 2.0 NCS CS
 21 mm 1.4 ED AS UMC CS
 35 mm 1.2 ED AS UMC CS
 50 mm 1.2 AS UMC CS
 300 mm 6.3 ED UMC CS

DSLRs

Premium lenses for DSLRs.
 XP 10 mm 3.5
 XP 14 mm 2.4
 XP 35 mm 1.2
 XP 50 mm 1.2
 XP 85 mm 1.2

Cinema lenses

Interchangeable cinema lenses.
 12 mm T3.1
 14 mm T3.1
 16 mm T2.6
 20 mm T1.9
 24 mm T1.5
 35 mm T1.5
 50 mm T1.5
 85 mm T1.5
 100 mm T3.1
 135 mm T2.2
 8 mm T3.8
 10 mm T3.1
 16 mm T2.2
 7.5 mm T3.8
 8 mm T3.1
 12 mm T2.2
 21 mm T1.5
 35 mm T1.3
 50 mm T1.3

Xeen cinema lenses

Cinema lenses are sold under the Xeen brand.
 XEEN 14 mm T3.1
 XEEN 16 mm T2.6
 XEEN 20 mm T1.9
 XEEN 24 mm T1.5
 XEEN 35 mm T1.5
 XEEN 50 mm T1.5
 XEEN 85 mm T1.5
 XEEN 135 mm T2.2

Discontinued products

Autofocus zoom lenses  

For Minolta/Sony A-mount, Nikon AF, Pentax KAF:
 AF 28-70 mm 3.5-4.5 
 AF 28-200 mm 4-5.6 
 AF 35-70 mm 3.5-4.5
 AF 35-135 mm 3.5 
 AF 70-210 mm 4-5.6

Manual focus prime lenses 
Manual focus prime T-mount mirror lenses.
 Samyang 300 mm 6.3 Reflex
 Samyang 330 mm 5.6
 Samyang 440 mm 5.6
 Samyang 500 mm 5.6
 Samyang 500 mm 6.3
  Samyang 500 mm /8 
 Samyang 500 mm 8 ED
 Samyang 500 mm 8 ED Preset
 Samyang 800 mm 8

Zoom 
 Samyang 650-1300 mm 8-16

Awards 

 2014 - VIP ASIA Awards : 50 mm T1.5 UMC
 2015 - GOOD DESIGN : XEEN
 2016 - E-Photozine 'Gear of the Year' :  XP 85 mm
 2016 - GOOD DESIGN : XP
 2017 - iF Design Awards
 2018 - Reddot Design Award
 2018 - TIPA Awards CSC Prime Lens : AF 35 mm 2.8 FE

Notes

External links

 

Manufacturing companies of South Korea
Companies based in Masan
Technology companies established in 1972
South Korean companies established in 1972
Optics manufacturing companies
Lens manufacturers
Video surveillance companies
Technology companies of South Korea
South Korean brands